An engine cart is an engine support on rollers used at an engine test stand.
For example, the combustion engine is mounted on this mobile support for holding the engine in an accurate position during the test.

Compared to a fixed support, the engine cart is used for preparing the combustion engine outside the test stand in a separate rigging area.
The transport from the rigging area to the test room is made manually.

External links
 ACS
 HORIBA Automotive Test Systems
 Superflow

Engines
Engine technology
Automotive tools